Pemba Island ( al-Jazīra al-khadrā, literally "The Green Island") is a Tanzanian island forming part of the Zanzibar Archipelago, lying within the Swahili Coast in the Indian Ocean.

Geography

In 1964, Zanzibar was united with the former colony of Tanganyika to form Tanzania. Together with Mafia Island (south of Unguja), these islands form the Spice Islands (not to be confused with the Maluku Islands of Indonesia).

Most of the island, which is hillier and more fertile than Unguja, is dominated by small scale farming. There is also large scale farming of cash crops such as cloves.

In previous years, the island was seldom visited due to inaccessibility and a reputation for political violence, with the notable exception of those drawn by its reputation as a center for traditional medicine and witchcraft. There is a quite large Arab community on the island, who immigrated from Oman. The population is a mix of Arab and original Waswahili inhabitants of the island. A significant portion of the population also identifies as Shirazi people.

The most important towns in Pemba are Chake-Chake (the capital), Mkoani, and Wete, which is the largest city. The centrally located Chake-Chake is perched on a mound with a view to the west on a bay and the tiny Misali Island, where the tides determine when a dhow can enter the local harbour. Pemba is, with the exception of a strip of land along its eastern coast, a very fertile place: besides clove trees, the locals grow mainly rice, coconut, bananas, cassava, and red beans (called maharagwe in the Swahili language).

Pemba is home to several dive sites, with steep drop-offs, untouched coral, and very abundant marine life.

Islets
Fundo - is located few miles from Wete. It is the only inhabited island among the group of islets forming the north-west reef of Pemba. The other islets there include Njao, Kashani, Kokota, Funzi, and Uvinje. 
Njao - is the northernmost islet on the Fundo group. It is mainly used for agricultural purposes. 
Kashani - is on the same reef as Fundo but on the southernmost tip close to Ras Mkumbuu.
Kokota - is located at the southern mouth of Wete port. 
Funzi - lies east of Kokota and south of Uvinje island.
Uvinje - is used for farming and located at the southern mouth of Wete port.
Kiweni (Shamiani) - located on the south west part of Pemba, it is an uninhabited islet used mainly for farming and livestock grazing. On its southernmost tip it has a very fine beach and some prospective investors were building a hotel in the late 1990s.
Kojani - is the only inhabited island on the western side of Pemba island. It is home to some skilled artisanal fishermen in East Africa who seasonally travel to most parts of the coast in search of schools of fish to catch.
Kwata - the island was the site of the first major outbreak of cholera in 1978 when travelers were temporarily quarantined at this island before being allowed into Pemba. 
Makoongwe - is few kilometers from Mkoani. It has characteristics similar to the opposite area on the island of Pemba with deep soils and hilly terrain. Makoongwe is inhabited and people do farming and fishing.
Matumbini - is an islet with dense mangrove forest and popular among fishermen due to the presence of rich coral reef.
Misali - has a rich coral reef, and has been declared a marine reserve. 
Mwangi - is a small islet close to Mtambwe on the main island of Pemba.
Panza - is the southernmost island in Pemba and in fact is a series of islets but a bridge connects the two main parts of Mtondooni and Panza proper. Its topography is coral on the Panza side and deep soil on the Mtondooni part. Its inhabitants do farming and fishing.
Vikunguni - is a small islet close to the north-west group of islands.
Yombi - is a small islet east of Panza island.

Important Bird Area
Pemba has been designated an Important Bird Area (IBA) by BirdLife International because it supports populations of Pemba green pigeons, Pemba scops owls, Pemba white-eyes and Pemba sunbirds.

Climate
Pemba has a tropical climate, yet somewhat milder than Tanzania's mainland and milder than in Unguja island. This climate is classified as "Aw" by the Köppen-Geiger system. The average temperature in Chake Chake is 25.5 °C (78 °F). The average annual rainfall is 1,364 mm. The monthly average temperatures are usually between 24 - 27.4 °C (75 °F - 81 °F). There are two rain seasons, with most rainfall coming between April and May and smaller rain season coming between November and December. Drier months are January - February, and a longer drier season between June to October.

Archaeology

Archaeological research on Pemba has shown its centrality to the Swahili coast trading system as early as 600 AD. Along the northern coast, urban settlements at Chwaka later developed and flourished from the eleventh century to ~1500 AD.

West of Pemba's capital Chake-Chake, on a long stretched peninsula called Ras Mkumbuu, one can find some of the oldest and best preserved series of early ruins on the islands (Ndagoni ruins, probably 14th century).

East of Chake-Chake one can find the Mkama Ndume ruins at Pujini village (south of the airport) within easy reach by road from Chake-Chake. This is the only known early fortification on the whole Swahili Coast; it is dated to the fifteenth century.

History

According to the Arab geographer Yakut, in the mid-13th century there were two independent sultans ruling over parts of Pemba Island.

On 24 June 2016, the Australian Minister for Infrastructure, Transport and Regional Development, Darren Chester, said that a piece of aircraft debris was found on Pemba Island, possibly being from the missing Malaysia Airlines Flight 370.

Administration

Pemba is part of the semi-autonomous Revolutionary Government of Zanzibar.  Administratively, it is divided into two regions, North Pemba (Pemba Kaskazini)with its capital at Wete, and South Pemba (Pemba Kusini) with its capital at Mkoani.  Although the centrally located city of Chake Chake, near the airport, is considered Pemba's capital, and is the seat of Pemba's court and the President of Zanzibar's official Pemba residence.

Economy

Fishing
Pemba is also famous for its rich fishing grounds. Between the island and the mainland there is the deep 50 kilometre wide Pemba Channel, which is one of the most profitable fishing grounds for game fishing on the Swahili Coast.

Farming and agriculture
Pemba is (with the exception of a strip of land along its eastern coast) highly fertile for agriculture which serves the global farming industry.

Cash crops
A large segment of Zanzibar export earnings comes from cloves. The greatest concentration of clove trees in Zanzibar is found on Pemba (3.5 million trees), as growing conditions on the island are superior to those on Unguja island. Clove trees grow to a height of approximately 10 to 15 metres and can be harvested for sometimes over 50 years. Most of the island, which is hillier and more fertile than Unguja, is dominated by small scale farming. There is also large-scale farming of other crops, primarily rice, coconuts, and red beans (called maharagwe in Swahili), as well as cassava and bananas.

Land surveying

For the promotion of tourism, the Department of Surveys and Mapping at Chake-Chake has been publishing maps with tourist guides since 1992.

Transport

Airport
Pemba Airport is also known as Wawi Airport or Karume Airport and connects the island to Arusha, Dar es Salaam, and Zanzibar City.

Gallery

See also

 Geography of Tanzania
 Ghurabiyya Shia

References

External links

Short documentary about Pemba Island on YouTube
Audio interview with Pemba Island resident about life on Pemba Island

 
Swahili city-states
Zanzibar Archipelago
Islands of Tanzania
Important Bird Areas of the Zanzibar Archipelago
Former sultanates
Island countries